Kathleen Marie Eisenhardt (born 1947) is the Stanford W. Ascherman, M.D. Professor and co-director of the Stanford Technology Ventures Program at Stanford University. She is also a corresponding fellow of the British Academy, having been elected in 2016.

Selected publications
Brown, Shona L. and Kathleen M. Eisenhardt, Competing on the Edge: Strategy as Structured Chaos. Harvard Business School Press, 1998. (winner, George R. Terry Book Award, Academy of Management).
Sull, Donald and Kathleen M. Eisenhardt, Simple Rules: How to Thrive in a Complex World. Houghton Mifflin Harcourt, 2015.

References

External links

Living people
American women academics
Stanford University faculty
Brown University School of Engineering alumni
Stanford University alumni
1947 births
Corresponding Fellows of the British Academy
21st-century American women